Georgi Konstantinovski (born 29 July 1930 in Kragujevac, Serbia, died 08 December 2020 in Skopje, North Macedonia) was a Macedonian architect, writer and educator. He graduated from the SS Cyril and Methodius University, Faculty of Architecture in Skopje in 1956 and received his Master of Architecture Degree from Yale University, under the mentorship of Paul Rudolph and Serge Chermayeff, in 1965. His early works are stylistically considered Brutalist. In New York City, he worked and collaborated with I. M. Pei, Henry Cobb Jr., and Araldo Cossutta.

In his search for design features that reflect the individual philosophy, structure, and art of each building, Konstantinovski designed more than 450 architectural and urban projects. He was awarded the highest Macedonian and Yugoslav architectural awards, such as the highest National Award for Art "11 Oktomvri" for Best Architectural Achievement in Skopje, in addition to three Grand Prix on the Architectural Biennale in Macedonia. He further contributed to contemporary Macedonian architecture as an educator and writer. He was President of the Council for Urban Planning and Dean of the Faculty of Architecture in Skopje, and a member of the Architectural Academy of Macedonia.

Konstantinovski was an important contributor to contemporary Macedonian architecture. Some of his most renowned buildings are the City Archive in Skopje, the Student's Dormitories "Goce Delcev", the Institute of Earthquake Engineering and Engineering Seismology, the ASNOM Memorial Center, and the Memorial House of Razlovci Uprising.

Early years
Born on July 29, 1930, in the town of Kragujevac in Serbia, Konstantinovski was the third child of mother Hristina, a high-school teacher, and father Hristo, a lawyer.  His mother came from the Stankovic family of musicians, well known in Kragujevac. His father was from the clan Curanovci of the village Smilevo, a revolutionary family during the Ilinden–Preobrazhenie Uprising.

Following the death of his mother (1933) and father (1934), Konstantinovski settled in Bitola in the Republic of Macedonia with his grandparents. He completed primary school there in 1941. The same year, Konstantinovski contracted malaria and was sent for treatment to Kerkovica in the Balkan Mountains until 1946. By 1946, he completed his high school education and was declared—together with fellow student Bojan Nicev from Veles—the best student. From 1946 to 1949, he continued his education at the High School Goce Delcev in Bitola. He graduated with excellent scores and again was declared best student. He was also awarded a special reward by the Ministry of Education of the Republic of Macedonia.

Education and work
In 1949, following the planned program of the Ministry of Education, Konstantinovski enrolled in the Architecture Department of the Technical Faculty in Skopje. In 1953, he worked on seaside residential settlement projects in the town of Haifa, Israel, at the Bureau of the Architect Samo Almosnino, as well as kibbutz city planning projects at the Jewish Agency Bureau. In 1956, he graduated from the Faculty of Architecture with distinctions and was employed at the Bureau of City Planning and Architecture in Skopje, to work on city planning for the town settlements of Zdanec and Cair. From 1956 to 1957, he did his military service with the engineering army unit in Split, Croatia.

In 1958, Konstantinovski became an assistant at the Technical Faculty, Skopje–Architecture Department on the subject of "Designing of Residential and Catering Buildings". He began practicing housing architecture in 1969 at the Bureau „Projekat", headed by architect Rajko Tatic, in Belgrade. In 1965, he obtained his master's degree at Yale University, Faculty of Arts and Architecture, under the mentorship of Paul Rudolph and Serge Chemaef. He worked on an administrative building project in 1965 at the Bureau of the Architect I. M. Pei in New York City.

From 1995 until his retirement, Konstantinovski was a full-time professor at the Faculty of Architecture in Skopje.

Professional career 

 1958–95
 Moved from assistant to full-time professor of the subject Designing of Residential and Catering Buildings
 Mentor to students obtaining M.Sc. and Ph.D. degrees, and post-graduates, and several hundred graduates
 Head of the Design Institute
 1983 – President of the Urbanism Council of the City of Skopje
 1987–88 – Dean of the Faculty of Architecture, SS Cyril and Methodius University, Skopje
 1999 – Member of the Macedonian Academy of Architecture

Lectures 

 1966–67 – 10 lectures on the greatest architects of the modern world architecture to architects in Skopje
 1977 – Modern Architecture in Macedonia at Kolarcev University in Belgrade
 1988 – My Architectural Work at the Faculty of Architecture in Belgrade
 1990 – Modern Architecture of Skopje at the International Congress of Architects in Bursa, Turkey
 1991–97 – Several lectures at the International Congress of Architects in Bursa, Turkey
 1994 – New Way of Housing at "Jildiz" University, Istanbul, Turkey

Publications 
 1967–68 – Editor-in-chief of articles on architecture in the daily newspaper Vecer
 1978–80 – Participant in the joint scientific piece of work Rational Residential Construction, Faculty of Architecture, Skopje
 1986 – XX Century Architecture, „Prosveta", Belgrade, chapter: "Modern Architecture in Macedonia"
 2001 – Builders in Macedonia VIII-XX century, volume 1, "Tabernakul", Skopje
 2003 – Builders in Macedonia VIII-XX century, volume 2, "Tabernakul", Skopje
 2006 – Builders in Macedonia VIII-XX century, volume 3, "Tabernakul", Skopje

Designs

List of significant buildings 
 1966 – Archive of the City of Skopje, Blvd. "Partizanski Odredi"
 1967 – Pensioners Recreation Home at Katlanovska Banja
 1969 – Students Dormitory "Goce Delcev", Skopje
 1971 – Printing House in Pristina, Kosovo – 
 1972 – Town Archive Building of Stip
 1974 – Town Archive Building of Ohrid
 1978 – Institute of Earthquake Engineering and Engineering Seismology "IZIIS", Skopje
 1979 – Memorial House of Razlovci Uprising in village Razlovci, near Delcevo
 1983 – Strumicko-Povardarska Eparchy, Veles
 1988 – Architectural and Urban Concept of the settlement "Jagula", Struga
 1989 – Administrative building and two residential blocks (GF+3 stories) at "Marsal Tito" Street, Struga
 1993 – Palace "Unija“ at "Ivo Ribar Lola" Street, Skopje
 1994 – Administrative-commercial building (Palace "Kuzman“) at "Ivo Ribar Lola" 58 Street, Skopje
 1995 – Residential building (GF+ Mezzanine +4 stories +top story) at "29 Noemvri" Street, Skopje (opposite Performance Hall "Univerzalna sala")
 1995 – Treatment Home „Sue Raider", Gjorce Petrov, Skopje

Studies 

 1986–2003
 Piransa, Pirastela, and Piradonija: studies on living in high residential structures
 Studies on low residential structures
 Studies on atrium houses in various geometric forms (e.g. circle, triangle, square, polygon, spiral)
 2006 – Residential mega-structure

Competitions 
 1969 – 1st prize, Students' Dormitory "Goce Delcev", Skopje
 1977 – 1st prize, Skopje City Hall (the only award)
 1993 – 1st prize, Orthodox Basilica in Strumica
 1998 – 1st prize, Parliament Building in Astana, Kazakhstan
 2005 – 1st prize, Memorial Museum ASNOM, village Pelince, Kumanovo
 Big number of first-ranked works, as well as many II and III prizes at level of former Yugoslavia.

Awards
 1969 – Borba plaquette for the Archive of Skopje
 1969 – 11 Oktomvri National award for the Archive of Skopje
 1972 – Borba plaquette for the Students' Dormitory "Goce Delcev", Skopje
 1981 – Borba plaquette for the Memorial House of Razlovci Uprising in village Razlovci, near Delcevo
 1981 – Grand Award of BIMAS for the Memorial House of Razlovci Uprising in village Razlovci
 1988 – Medal of labor with gold wreath
 1995 – Grand Reward of BIMAS for the Palace "Unija", Skopje
 1999 – Award Andrea Damjanov for lifework
 2005 – Grand Award for architecture for the Memorial Museum "ASNOM"

Honorary duties 
 1965 – Guest of the Senator Robert Kennedy and the State Secretary, Mr. McPherson, in Washington on the occasion of the International Students Day in the USA as the only representative of the University in Yale, New Haven, USA
 1991 – Declared the best architect of Yugoslavia at the Third Belgrade Triennial of World Architecture
 1991 – Declared one among the 55 best world architects at the Third Belgrade Triennial World Architecture

References

1930 births
Architects from Skopje
Modernist architects
Brutalist architects
Living people
Ss. Cyril and Methodius University of Skopje alumni
Yale University alumni
People from Kragujevac